Stephen Maynard Clark (23 April 1960 – 8 January 1991) was an English musician. He was a songwriter and guitarist for the English hard rock band Def Leppard until 1991, when he died from alcohol poisoning. In 2007, Clark was ranked No. 11 on Classic Rock Magazine's "100 Wildest Guitar Heroes". In 2019, Clark was posthumously inducted into the Rock and Roll Hall of Fame as a member of Def Leppard.

Biography

Childhood and adolescence
Stephen Maynard Clark was born and raised in Wisewood, Sheffield, to Barrie and Beryl (nee Beckingham) Clark. From an early age, he showed an interest in music, attending his first concert featuring Cliff Richard and the Shadows at age six.  At 11, he received his first guitar which was purchased by his father on the condition that he learn to play. Clark studied classical guitar for a year before he first heard the music of Jimmy Page and Led Zeppelin at a friend's house.

When Clark left school, his first employer was an engineering firm called GEC Traction where he worked as a lathe operator. He was three years into a four-year apprenticeship with the firm at the time Def Leppard was signed to a record deal with Phonogram Records.

Career with Def Leppard
Before joining Def Leppard in 1978, Clark played cover songs with his band Electric Chicken in Sheffield. Around that time, he met Pete Willis (Def Leppard's original guitarist and founder) at a technical college. Willis spotted Clark reading a guitar book and asked if he played. He then invited Clark to come and audition for his band, as they were looking to add a second guitarist. Clark never showed up, but when Willis and singer Joe Elliott bumped into Clark again at a Judas Priest gig, Willis re-issued his invitation. Clark finally came down to their rehearsal room and joined Def Leppard in January 1978.  According to Elliott in Behind the Music, Clark auditioned for Def Leppard by playing all of Lynyrd Skynyrd's "Free Bird" without accompaniment. While a member of Def Leppard, Clark wrote or co-wrote over 90% of the band's songs. Clark and Pete Willis shared lead guitar duties, and Clark was nicknamed "The Riffmaster" due to his talent and ability to come up with guitar riffs.

Toward the end of the Pyromania recording sessions in 1982, Pete Willis was asked to leave the band, and guitarist Phil Collen was recruited into the band to replace him. Clark and Collen quickly bonded, becoming close friends and leading to the trademark dual-guitar sound of Def Leppard. He and Collen became known as the "Terror Twins" in recognition of their close friendship and alcohol-fueled antics offstage. Part of their success as a duo was attributed to their ability to swap between rhythm and lead guitar, with both playing lead or both doing rhythm within the same song. The fact that they came from entirely different musical backgrounds also contributed to their unique guitar partnership. Clark was a classically-trained musician who knew the rules of music and could read and write music and understood the theory and science of the art, as well as studying/being influenced by Jimmy Page and Led Zeppelin; whereas Collen, like Willis, was self-taught and developed his fast, alternate-picking technique from studying Al Di Meola and listening to jazz players. Clark once said, "I do read and write and I know the rules of music which is great in a two-guitar band because we're so different in our approach to playing. Phil will play something if it sounds right, whereas I look at things and say: 'it's wrong to play that note; it's not musically correct'."

Clark primarily played Gibson Guitars during his career and signed an endorsement with Gibson in 1987. Gibson made some custom-specification guitars for Clark. He was occasionally seen playing other guitars, including a Fender Stratocaster for the song and video "Love Bites". Clark would also use Fenders in the studio occasionally, due to their unique sound.

Although his name appears on many songwriting credits for Def Leppard's 1992 album, Adrenalize, he did not contribute much to the recording of the album. In the liner notes of the Adrenalize deluxe edition, Joe Elliott claims that a few riffs Clark had demoed were used in a couple of places on the album. His only other contribution was an occasional approval of what the rest of the band was working on, referring to it as "cool". The song "White Lightning" described the effects of Clark's alcohol and drug addictions. However, the deluxe rerelease of Adrenalize features a demo of the song "Tonight", which Clark performed in, having been recorded in 1988, intended to be a B-side for Hysteria.

Clark was involved in the recording of the demo for the band's 1995 single "When Love & Hate Collide", just days before his 1991 death. The song at the time was reminiscent of the Hysteria and Adrenalize sound as opposed to the newer sound of the next album Slang. The demo of this song contains the final solo Clark ever performed. A demo of Clark's solo was found for the song "Stand Up (Kick Love into Motion)" but was never integrated into any official material.

Personal life
Clark was engaged to an American model, Lorelei Shellist, the two having been together seven years. Shellist revealed in her autobiography, Runway Runaway, that Clark's addictions played a major role in their breakup. Clark was addicted to alcohol. In 1989, his Def Leppard bandmate Phil Collen and others held an intervention to urge him to cease his alcohol abuse. Clark agreed to enter a rehabilitation centre, but left without completing the programme and resumed drinking.

Death
At the time of his death, Clark was on a leave of absence from Def Leppard. "We'd given him six months off," recalled Joe Elliott, "told him to go and spend some time in the beautiful house he'd bought in Chelsea, eat some food he'd cooked himself, and take his clothes out of the suitcase and put them in the wardrobe. But instead he spent most of his time in the pub round the corner, and do things like get so drunk he'd fall down the stairs and crack his rib. So he'd be on serious medication for cracked ribs. Then he'd carry on drinking." Weeks prior to his death, Clark had registered a blood alcohol level of 0.59%.

On 8 January 1991, Clark was found dead on his couch by his girlfriend. He was 30 years old. The postmortem revealed that the cause of death was respiratory failure caused by a lethal mixture of alcohol and prescription drugs. At the time of his death, Clark had a blood alcohol level of .30% and morphine in his system. Daniel Van Alphen, Clark's drinking companion the night before, testified that they went to a local pub and returned to Clark's home at midnight to watch a video.

He was buried at Wisewood Cemetery located in Loxley, Sheffield, near to where the Clark family still reside. Tesla, who opened for Def Leppard on the Hysteria tour, recorded a tribute to Clark entitled "Song & Emotion (To Our Friend, Steve 'Steamin' Clark)" for their album Psychotic Supper.

Discography

Studio albums
On Through the Night
High 'n' Dry
Pyromania
Hysteria 
Adrenalize (songwriting and demos only)

Compilation albums
Retro Active
Vault: Def Leppard Greatest Hits (1980–1995)
Best of Def Leppard
Rock of Ages: The Definitive Collection

Live albums
Viva! Hysteria Tribute (Intro to Gods of War taken from Live: In the Round, in Your Face)

Extended plays
The Def Leppard E.P.

Videos
Historia
Live: In the Round, in Your Face
Visualize
Video Archive
Best of the Videos
Rock of Ages – The DVD Collection
Viva! Hysteria Tribute (Intro to Gods of War taken from Live: In the Round, in Your Face)

References

External links
Steve Clark @ DefLeppard.com
Steve Clark Guitar – In Loving Memory 

1960 births
1991 deaths
Accidental deaths in London
English heavy metal guitarists
English rock guitarists
Def Leppard members
People from Hillsborough, Sheffield
Drug-related deaths in England
Alcohol-related deaths in England
Lead guitarists
20th-century English male musicians
20th-century British guitarists
Musicians from Sheffield